The Wilton Arms is a Grade II listed public house located in Kinnerton Street, Belgravia, London and built in 1825–26. 

The lease was held by Shepherd Neame, and the pub closed in July 2019. It is now leased by Inda Pubs, and reopened in September 2021.

References

Grade II listed pubs in the City of Westminster
Belgravia